Carhoo may refer to the following places in the Republic of Ireland:

Carhoo Hill
Carhoo Lower
Carhoo Upper